Theophilus or Theophilos was a historian and geographer, if at least the passages about to be quoted refer to one and the same person. He is mentioned by Josephus (c. Apion. i. 23) among those writers, who had noticed the Jews. The third book of his work on Italy, and the second of that on the Peloponnesus, are quoted by Plutarch (Parallela Minora, 13, 32, pp. 309, a., 313, d). Plutarch also (de Fluv. 24) cites the first book of a work of Theophilus. (Vossius, de Hist. Graec. p. 504, ed. Westermann.)

References

Ancient Greek geographers